The banded seabream (Diplodus fasciatus) is a species of marine fish of the family Sparidae. The species was first described as Sargus fasciatus by Achille Valenciennes in 1830.

Description
This benthopelagic fish grows to an average length of 30 cm, maximum 45 cm. It feeds predominantly on small invertebrates.

Distribution
The fish inhabits rocky bottoms in waters down to 100 metres depth. It occurs in the eastern Atlantic, off the coast of Cape Verde.

References

Further reading
 Eschmeyer, William N., ed. 1998. Catalog of Fishes. Special Publication of the Center for Biodiversity Research and Information, no. 1, vol. 1–3. California Academy of Sciences. San Francisco, California, USA. 2905. .
 Fenner, Robert M. The Conscientious Marine Aquarist. Neptune City, New Jersey, USA: T.F.H. Publications, 2001.
 Helfman, G., B. Collette and D. Facey: The diversity of fishes. Blackwell Science, Malden, Massachusetts, USA, 1997.
 Hoese, D.F. 1986. A M.M. Smith and P.C. Heemstra (eds.) Smiths' sea fishes. Springer-Verlag, Berlin, Germany
 Maugé, L.A. 1986. A J. Daget, J.-P. Gosse and D.F.E. Thys van den Audenaerde (eds.) Check-list of the freshwater fishes of Africa (CLOFFA). ISNB, Brussels; MRAC, Tervuren, Flanders; and ORSTOM, Paris, France, Vol. 2.
 Moyle, P. and J. Cech.: Fishes: An Introduction to Ichthyology, 4th ed., Upper Saddle River, New Jersey, USA: Prentice-Hall. 2000.
 Nelson, J.: Fishes of the World, 3rd ed.. New York, USA: John Wiley and Sons., 1994
 Wheeler, A.: The World Encyclopedia of Fishes, 2nd ed., London: Macdonald., 1985

banded seabream
Fish of West Africa
banded seabream
Taxa named by Achille Valenciennes